represented Japan in archery.

Career 

She was born in Hiroshima.

Yamazaki competed at the 1976 Summer Olympic Games in the women's individual event and finished 26th with a score of 2094 points.

References

External links 

 Profile on worldarchery.org

1954 births
Living people
Japanese female archers
Olympic archers of Japan
Archers at the 1976 Summer Olympics
Sportspeople from Hiroshima
20th-century Japanese women